Sahil is a 1954 Bollywood film starring Shammi Kapoor and Chitra.

Cast
Shammi Kapoor
Chitra

Music

References

External links
 

1959 films
1950s Hindi-language films
Films scored by Suresh Talwar